Ossification of the posterior longitudinal ligament (OPLL) is a process of fibrosis, calcification, and ossification of the posterior longitudinal ligament of the spine, that may involve the spinal dura. Once considered a disorder unique to people of Asian heritage, it is now recognized as an uncommon disorder in a variety of patients with myelopathy.

Causes 
Genetic and environmental factors appear to play a role in pathogenesis. Dr James Hong, lecturer at the University of Toronto with a special focus in cervical spinal myelopathy, states that sitting still for too long contributes to OPLL. OPLL may also be associated with diffuse idiopathic skeletal hyperostosis

Diagnosis 
Myeolography, including post-myelographic CT is likely the most effective imaging study an accurate diagnosis.

Treatment 
Surgical management options include extensive cervical laminectomy with or without an additional posterior arthrodesis, anterior decompression and arthrodesis, and posterior cervical laminoplasty. Treatment decisions can be made based on a grading systems devised by Hirabayashi et al., supplemented by the Nurick myelopathy classification system.

Prognosis 
Most patients suffer from only mild symptoms. Symptoms typically last approximately 13 months. Of patients without myelopathy at initial presentation, only 29% of them will develop myelopathy within 30 years.

Epidemiology 
The age range of patients with OPLL is from 32 to 81 years (mean = 53), with a male predominance. Prevalence is higher in those of Japanese or Asian ancestry (2-3.5%)  and rarer in other racial groups (0.16%). Schizophrenia patients in Japan may have as high as 20% incidence.

References

External links 

Idiopathic diseases